Brave New World is an American science fiction drama series loosely based on the classic novel of the same name by Aldous Huxley. It premiered on the NBCUniversal streaming service Peacock on July 15, 2020. In October 2020, the series was cancelled after one season.

Premise
The series "imagines a utopian society that has achieved peace and stability through the prohibition of monogamy, privacy, money, family and history itself." In an update of the original novel, an artificial intelligence system named Indra also connects citizens via a wireless network.

Summary
The series unfolds around a man (John) flawed in his relationships, transitioning from The Savage Lands whose citizens survive by entertaining New London, to New London, whose citizens live or serve an anti-monogamous, anti-solipsistic hedonistic existence. His mother facilitates their escape, but dies in the process. She wishes a better life for her son, but John's flippant influence infects and ultimately destroys New London society by disrupting its morally questionable caste system, while never taking responsibility for his actions. In the aftermath, the New London AI (Indra) now embodied in John's now ex-bestfriend (Bernard) is free to perhaps make the citizens of The Savage Lands a little less "savage", and John's now ex-girlfriend (Lenina) is promoted to perhaps make New London a little more "savage".

Cast and characters
 Alden Ehrenreich as John the Savage
 Jessica Brown Findlay as Lenina Crowne, a technician who works at the Hatchery. She is a B+ who is a patient of Bernard.
 Harry Lloyd as Bernard Marx, an A+ who works as a counselor
 Kylie Bunbury as Frannie Crowne, a close friend to Lenina
 Nina Sosanya as Mustafa Mond
 Joseph Morgan as CJack60/Elliott 
 Sen Mitsuji as Henry Foster
 Nicholle Hembra as Alpha Female
 Hannah John-Kamen as Wilhelmina "Helm" Watson
 Demi Moore as Linda, John's mother who lives in The Savage Lands in a house with her son
 Jimmy Winch as Young John the Savage
 Ed Stoppard as the Director of Stability

Episodes

Production
In 2015, Syfy announced their intention to develop the series, with Darryl Frank and Justin Falvey producing. In 2016, writers Les Bohem, Grant Morrison, and Brian Taylor were attached to the project. On February 13, 2019, the series was moved to the USA Network, with David Wiener replacing Bohem as a writer and Owen Harris directing the pilot.

In April 2019, Ehrenreich was cast as John the Savage. In the same month, it was announced that Lloyd would be cast in the series regular role as Bernard Marx. In May 2019, it was announced that Jessica Brown Findlay would be cast in the role of Lenina Crowne. In June 2019, Kylie Bunbury, Hannah John-Kamen, Sen Mitsuji, Joseph Morgan, and Nina Sosanya were added to the main cast in various supporting roles, with Demi Moore set to appear in a recurring role. On September 17, 2019, NBCUniversal announced that the series would be moved to Peacock. The series premiered on July 15, 2020.

Dungeness Estate in Kent is the location for the "Savage Lands"; the Old Lifeboat Station there doubles as John and Linda's house.

On October 28, 2020, Peacock canceled the series after one season. It marked the first major TV series cancellation for the streaming service.

Reception
On Rotten Tomatoes, the series holds an approval rating of 46% based on 56 reviews, with an average rating of 5.70/10. The website's critical consensus reads: 

On Metacritic, the series has a weighted average score of 55 out of 100 based on 26 reviews, indicating "mixed or average reviews".

Sonia Saraiya of Vanity Fair gave it a positive review: 

Judy Berman of Time suggests the show owed more to Westworld than Huxley, but said the series looked gorgeous and the performances were solid. Even so, Berman found the show lacking: 

Daniel D'Addario of Variety gave the series a mixed review:

Accolades

Release 
Brave New World premiered on July 15, 2020, on Peacock in the United States, and Sky One in the UK on October 2, 2020. Internationally, the series was originally scheduled to premiere on Amazon Prime Video in Oceania and New Zealand on August 21, but the series was instead released on September 18, 2020. In Canada, the series was released on Showcase on September 13, 2020.
In Russia, the series was released on July 16, 2020, on the streaming service KinoPoisk HD. In Germany, the series was released on the streaming service TVNOW at the end of September 2020. In Australia, the series was released on the streaming service Stan on October 16, 2020. In Spain and Europe, the series was released on the streaming service Starzplay on October 4, 2020.

See also
 Brave New World (1980 film)
 Brave New World (1998 film)
 Demolition Man (1993 film)

References

External links
 
  

2020 American television series debuts
2020 American television series endings
2020s American drama television series
2020s American science fiction television series
Brave New World
Dystopian television series
English-language television shows
Peacock (streaming service) original programming
Television series by Amblin Entertainment
Television series by Universal Content Productions
Television shows based on British novels
Television series set in the future